Allium desertorum is a species of onion found in Israel, Jordan, Palestine, and Egypt (including Sinai). It is a small bulb-forming perennial; flowers are white with purple midveins along the tepals.

References

External links
photo of herbarium specimen, isotype of Allium desertorum

desertorum
Flora of Egypt
Flora of Palestine (region)
Flora of Sinai
Plants described in 1775